Otto Berg may refer to:

Otto Berg (athlete) (1906–1991), Norwegian long jumper
Otto Karl Berg (1815–1866), German botanist who named the Feijoa
Otto Berg (scientist) (1873–1939), German scientist who co-discovered Rhenium